Zigana is a semi-automatic   pistol produced by Turkish firearm manufacturing company TİSAŞ. The pistol was started to be produced in 2001 and is one of the first pistols in Turkey with an original design. Zigana pistols have a locked-slide short recoil operating mechanism with a modified Browning-type locking system. In addition, these pistols also have an automatic firing pin block. Zigana PX-9 model is produced in Malaysia in partnership with Turkey. In Pakistan, Zigana models are produced and sold illegally by local workshops.

Variants 

Zigana is imported by American Tactical Imports in the United States and marketed under the FS9 and FS40 names. In addition, the Zigana K and Zigana F models are licensed under the name of Zəfər, Zəfər-K and Inam by the Ministry of Defense Industry of the Republic of Azerbaijan.

Users (non civil) 

 : Zəfər, Zəfər-K, Zəfər-P and Inam variants in use by Azerbaijani Armed Forces and  Police Units.
 : Used by a limited number of military units and private security companies.
 : The Zigana PX-9 model is used by the Philippine police forces.
 : Annually, 20,000 Zigana PX-9 model pistols are produced mostly for the use of Malaysian military personnel and police.
 U.S. Coast Guard. Destiny Florida and likely elsewhere.

References 

Semi-automatic pistols of Turkey
9mm Parabellum semi-automatic pistols